Typhoon Mireille, known in the Philippines as Typhoon Rosing, was the costliest typhoon on record, until it was surpassed by Typhoon Hagibis in 2019 (when not adjusted for inflation). Striking Japan in September 1991, it became the 20th named storm of the 1991 Pacific typhoon season, Mireille formed on September 13 from the monsoon trough near the Marshall Islands. It moved westward for several days as a small system, steered by the subtropical ridge to the north. The storm rapidly intensified to typhoon status on September 16, and several days later passed north of Saipan in the Northern Marianas Islands. Mireille intensified further after deleterious effects from a nearby tropical storm subsided. The typhoon weakened slightly while turning northward, passing just east of Miyako-jima and later to the west of Okinawa. The storm accelerated to the northeast through the Sea of Japan, moving over Hokkaido before becoming extratropical on September 28. The remnants of Mireille continued to the east, passing through the Aleutian Islands of Alaska on October 1.

The typhoon first threatened Guam, although it passed well to the north of the island, bringing damaging winds to northern Saipan. The first part of Japan affected was Miyako-jima, where heavy rainfall and high winds damaged crops. Mireille lashed Okinawa with strong waves, while strong winds up to  damaged power lines and trees. The typhoon ultimately caused damage in 41 of 47 prefectures of Japan, with overall damage estimated at $10 billion (USD), making it the costliest typhoon on record as of 2017. The winds caused record power outages across Japan that affected 7.36 million people, or about 13% of total customers. Mireille also left extensive crop damage totaling $3 billion, mostly to the apple industry, after 345,000 tons of apples fell to the ground and another 43,000 were damaged on the trees. The storm damaged over 670,000 houses, of which 1,058 were destroyed, and another 22,965 were flooded. Throughout Japan, Mireille killed 66 people and injured another 2,862 people, including ten deaths on a capsized freighter. Elsewhere, the typhoon killed two people in South Korea, and its remnants brought strong winds to Alaska.

Meteorological history

The origins of Mireille were from a poorly-organized area of convection, or thunderstorms, associated with the monsoon trough near the Marshall Islands on September 13. That day, the Japan Meteorological Agency (JMA) began tracking the system as a tropical depression. The system moved westward, developing a large increase in thunderstorms over the center on September 15. About six hours later, the agency upgraded the depression to Tropical Storm Mireille, after satellite imagery indicated the storm was very compact and intensifying quickly. The JTWC later determined in a post-storm analysis that Mireille had attained tropical storm status 12 hours earlier on the previous day. Also at the time of it attaining tropical storm status, Mireille was one of three storms in the basin, along with Tropical Storm Luke to the northwest and Typhoon Nat to the west in the South China Sea.

The small storm moved west-northwestward due to the influence of the subtropical ridge to the north. On September 17, the track shifted to the west-southwest, threatening Guam. For several days, Mireille failed to intensify due to wind shear from the larger Tropical Storm Luke to the north. After Luke weakened and progressed northward, Mireille was able to strengthen more gradually, as well as increase in size. On September 22, the typhoon strengthened into a super typhoon, which is an unofficial category used by the JTWC for storms reaching 1‑minute winds of at least , equivalent to a strong Category 4 hurricane on the SSHWS.

Around the time of reaching peak intensity, Mireille turned more to the northwest along the southwestern periphery of the subtropical ridge. The increasing size began to impart wind shear in Typhoon Nat to the west, and the two storms underwent the Fujiwhara effect, in which Nat turned sharply southward while Mireille progressed toward the Ryukyu Islands of Japan. That day, the typhoon accelerated to the northeast due to increasing mid-level winds from the southwest, passing west of Okinawa. The typhoon made landfall at that strength at 07:00 UTC between Saikai and Nagasaki along southwest Kyushu.

The typhoon quickly weakened while continuing northeastward through Kyushu and western Honshu, and started to become an extratropical cyclone; during the process, the wind field expanded, aided by moist air from the southwest and cold air from the northwest. It accelerated further over the Sea of Japan, and late on September 27, Mireille made a second landfall in Japan along southwestern Hokkaido at 22:00 UTC, with 10‑minute winds of  still at typhoon status. Crossing the island, the typhoon weakened to tropical storm status early on September 28, and shortly thereafter became fully extratropical in the Sea of Okhotsk. The powerful remnants of Mireille continued eastward, crossing the Aleutian Islands on September 29 and crossed the International Date Line shortly thereafter. After crossing the dateline, Mireille's remnants turned northeast and struck the Seward Peninsula on October 3 before moving over Arctic Alaska. The system then moved over the Arctic Ocean where it was last noted on October 4.

Preparations and impact
Early tropical cyclone computer models anticipated Mireille would pass close to Guam, prompting officials to undergo preparations for the storm. The storm ultimately passed north of Saipan, causing damage along the island's northern portion. Mireille knocked over trees and damaged over 70% of Saipan's crops while also eroding coastal roads.

In South Korea, two people were killed with two others reported missing. A South Korean freighter rode out the storm at the port in Hakata Bay. It breached along the breakwater, causing it to sink, killing all 10 crew members. The Japan Coast Guard launched a search and rescue mission for two days.

Japan

Ahead of the storm, the JMA issued 99 typhoon bulletins, warning residents about Mireille. There were 236 warnings related to storm surge, high winds, waves, and flooding. In Hiroshima, most residents were aware of the approaching storm, about 70% of residents did not expect significant effects. In general, residents were unprepared for the storm, partly due to the lack of recent storms. Transportation in Japan was disrupted after 480 domestic flights cancelled, stranding 58,000 individuals, and road, rail, and ferry traffic was halted. In Hokkaido, 207 schools were closed due to the storm.

Mireille was the strongest typhoon to hit Japan since Typhoon Nancy in 1961, causing heavy damage in 41 of 47 prefectures. It was the third storm to strike Japan in two weeks. Damage was heaviest on Kyushu where the storm made landfall. Because the storm moved northeastward through the Sea of Japan, the eastern quadrant of the storm crossed over much of the country, which is where the strongest winds in tropical cyclones are located. The high winds downed trees, damaged roofs, and left record power outages, affecting 7.36 million people, or about 13% of total customers. In some areas, the power outages lasted as little as three minutes. The storm damaged over 670,000 houses, of which 1,058 were destroyed, and another 22,965 were flooded. Power outages caused at least five factories to shut down production. Along the coast, the typhoon damaged 930 ships, with dozens sunk or blown ashore. Most of the damage was related to agriculture or forests. Sea spray heavily damaged fruit trees and rice paddies. Crop damage amounted to $3 billion, mostly to the apple industry, after 345,000 tons of apples fell to the ground and another 43,000 were damaged on the trees. Most farms lost 80% of their crop, potentially taking 10 years to regrow. Persistent cloudiness and rainfall following the storm diminished sunlight by 50%, furthering crop damage. There were 62 deaths in Japan and 2,862 injuries, including the deaths on the South Korean freighter, making it the deadliest typhoon there in 10 years. About 80% of the deaths were male, and 70% were over 60 years old. Most of the deaths were related to wind-blown debris, falling due to the wind, or being trapped or struck by fallen objects. The $6 billion in insured losses and $10 billion in overall damage made Mireille the costliest typhoon on record as of January 2015, according to Munich Re.

When Mireille moved through western Japan, it brought strong winds and heavy rainfall. This was the highest wind report at the station since records began in 1946. The strongest wind gusts occurred concurrently with a sudden drop in atmospheric pressure, primarily from Kyushu and extending east-northeastward into the Chūgoku region of Honshu. Mireille produced record wind gusts at 26 locations and record sustained winds at 12 locations. About two-thirds of the wind stations reported the strongest winds from the west after Mireille passed the area. The rains caused at least 13 landslides and flooded rivers in four locations. However, effects from rainfall were limited due to the storm's fast forward motion. Mireille also struck around the time of high tide, causing extensive storm surge along the coast.

Mireille first passed near Miyako-jima, dropping  of rainfall there. Wind gusts on the island reached , which caused some crop damage to sugar cane and vegetables. All flights were canceled as Mireille passed the island. Later, the typhoon bypassed Okinawa to the west. Mireille produced heavy rainfall on Okinawa, totaling , which allowed water restrictions there to be lifted for the rest of the year. The precipitation fell in a short amount of time;  dropped in just 10 minutes, and  dropped in an hour, both at Naha. Waves reached  along the coast of Okinawa. On Kume Island, the combination of high waves and tides produced damaging storm surge. The storm flooded 74 houses and damaged another 37. Mireille damaged roads in two locations, while winds damaged 157 power lines, which cut communications to 3,123 people. The storm also left heavy damage to the agriculture and forest industries. In the region, Mireille caused 44 flights to be canceled. Two people were injured on Okinawa, and overall damage in the prefecture totaled ¥1.5 billion (US$11.4 million).

In Kyushu, the heavy rainfall caused flooding and landslides, which buried several houses in Miyazaki Prefecture and forced 75 people to evacuate. The high wind knocked over many cypress or cedar trees, totaling  and accounting for ¥64 billion (US$530 million) in damage in Ōita Prefecture alone. Damage was heaviest near Nagasaki, where 16 people were killed, including five after a warehouse collapsed during the storm. A construction worker in nearby Isahaya was killed when the winds struck him with a prebuilt hut, and airborne debris killed five people in Kumamoto Prefecture and seven in Fukuoka Prefecture. Throughout Kyushu, about 2 million people lost power. High winds and waves in Kagoshima Prefecture overturned several cars, killing one person in Ōshima. Throughout Kyushu, about 2 million people lost power. On nearby Shikoku island, high winds and rains caused ¥4.7 billion (US$35.7 million) in damage in Tokushima, mostly related to fisheries, crops, and houses. A record storm surge, in conjunction with high winds, damaged a school in Sakaide, as well as a floating pier and coastal road in nearby Ehime Prefecture. Rough surf swept away a woman in Matsuyama.

The storm track brought Mireille west of the most populated island of Honshu, limiting damage there compared to Kyushu. At Misawa Air Base, the strong winds knocked over trees and blew off the roofs of several warehouses, and also knocked off storage sheds off their foundation. Ahead of the storm, advance warning allowed the American military to shelter aircraft and warn the population. Damage was estimated between $500,000–$1.5 million. Two of Mazda's loading docks in Hiroshima were completely destroyed, affecting American inventories of 1992 Mazda 929's until the end of November 1991. Also in the city, 1.1 million residents, or 80% of households, lost power due to winds and storm surge. The strong winds and waves damaged the Itsukushima Shrine near Hiroshima and Kenroku-en northwest of Tokyo. In Okayama Prefecture, salt spray damaged railways and shut down lines for three days. High winds in Naka-ku collapsed scaffolding from a parking garage, and another damaged scaffolding nearby forced a road to shut down. There were extensive crop losses in northern Honshu. In Toyama Prefecture, the winds destroyed 192 greenhouses and exasperated a fire that caused further crop damage.

Striking Hokkaido with much of its former intensity, Mireille produced strong winds across the island. Light rains occurred on the island, reaching  in Hidaka. In Hakodate, the storm damaged five buildings, and about 3,000 houses lost power. There was scattered roof damage across Hokkaido, and flying glass injured one person.

Aftermath
By a day after the storm made landfall, the record power outages were largely restored. However, salt damage prevented restoration in some areas for several days. The outages left residents temporarily without water after water pumps were shut down. In Hiroshima, lack of power caused traffic congestion, shut down banks, and disrupted hospitals. The widespread power outages related to Mireille prompted the government to reconstruct transmission towers with anemometer, or wind measurement devices. Following the storm, insurance companies paid $6 billion to policy holders in Japan, which was a world record related to wind damage; this was surpassed less than a year later by Hurricane Andrew striking Florida. The typhoon still holds the title as the costliest non-Atlantic hurricane.

Due to the severity of damage and loss of life caused by the storm, the name Mireille was retired and replaced with Melissa.

See also

Typhoon Sarah (1959) – Similarly powerful typhoon that also recurved near South Korea and Japan
Typhoon Chaba (2004) – Typhoon that moved northeastward through Japan

Notes

References

Retired Pacific typhoons
1991 Pacific typhoon season
Typhoons in Japan
Typhoon Mireille
Mireille